Emilio Pujol Vilarrubí (or Emili; 10 September 1886 – 21 November 1980) was a Spanish composer, guitarist and a leading teacher of the classical guitar.

Biography
Emili Pujol was born in the little village of Granadella just outside Lleida, Spain. He began his studies with Francisco Tárrega in 1902, when he was sixteen years of age. At this time, Miguel Llobet was making his debut as a concert artist outside Barcelona. Pujol fondly remembered his first encounter with Tárrega and in his biography of his teacher, he described his mestre in very endearing, romantic terms.

During the war years 1914–1918 he did not travel much and mainly remained in Catalonia. In 1918 he undertook his first tour of South America, starting in Buenos Aires. The only major interruptions in his concert travels were his marriage to Matilde Cuervas in Paris, an Andalusian flamenco guitarist, and the period of time he devoted to historical research in Paris into the instrumental predecessors of the guitar. During this period he partnered with the publisher Max Eschig in publishing his "Bibliothèque de musique ancienne et moderne pour guitare" (from 1927), resulting in numerous works for solo guitar by historical and contemporary composers. The beginning signs of World War II also prevented him from continuing his concert career.

From 1935 through 1940, Pujol continued giving a few concerts and lectures as well as pursuing his research in Spain, London and Paris. By 1941 he was back in Spain to the end of his life, and he started preparing the volume covering the composer for vihuela, Luis de Narváez, for  the series Monumentos de la Música Española (vol. III). The volume was eventually followed by volumes covering Alonso Mudarra (1949) and Valderrábano (1963). Prior to his death, Pujol had begun work on the largest of vihuela music books, the Orphenica Lyra by Miguel Fuenllana, published in 1554. He considered this book to be the pinnacle of the vihuela school and regarded Fuenllana as the final spokesman for this brief, courtly instrumental period in Spanish music.

In 1946, Pujol began his guitar classes at the Lisbon Conservatory of Music, which continued through to 1969. During this period he was involved in giving master classes (in 1953 he was personally invited by Andrés Segovia to give classes at the Accademia Musicale Chigiana) and adjudicating at guitar competitions. Also at this time, Pujol's first wife Matilde Cuervas died (1956). Seven years later he married Maria Adelaide Robert, a noted Portuguese pianist and singer who greatly assisted him in his final years.

Beginning in the summer of 1965, Pujol launched his International Courses of Guitar, Lute and Vihuela in the city of Lleida, Spain. This event became quite popular and was attended by students and teachers from throughout the world. It was repeated every summer over a ten-year period, and in 1969 it was moved to the thirteenth-century village of Cervera.

His words on Tárrega's School of Guitar are also applicable to his own spirit, which constantly strived to "resolving in advance all the problems, which can arise out of the diverse elements which contribute to the performance of a work: instrument, hands and spirit."

Prominent students
Alberto Ponce
Pieter van der Staak
Hopkinson Smith
Giuliano Balestra
Carles Trepat
Armando Marrosu
Hector Garcia
Ned Sublette
Manuel Cubedo (guitarist)

Selected list of compositions

Original compositions
124 original compositions (Joan Riera)

??
Escuela Razonada de la Guitarra Vol I-IV
El Abejorro
Ondinas
Canción de Cuna
Barcarolle
Cubana
Impromptu
Piezas Españolas
Pieza nº 2 (Guajira o Evocación Cubana)
Pieza nº 3 (Tango Español)
Preludios
Scottish Madrileño
Sevilla
Danzas Españolas
Tango
Tonadilla
Guajira
La Libelula
Etude Romantico
Variations on a theme by Aguado
Etude Romantico
Festivola

Solo guitar
(ME numbers refer to the catalogue number of his publisher, Max Eschig, Paris)

 ME 7899 Aquelarre (Danse des sorcières - 1969) Pujol n°1246
 ME 7028 Atardecer (Crépuscule) Pujol n°1229
 ME 7238 Barcarolle Pujol n°1235
 ME 7580 Becqueriana (Endecha) Pujol n°1240
 ME 3130 Cancion de Cuna (Berceuse) Pujol n°1203
 ME 7884 Canto de Otono (Chant d’automne) Pujol n°1245
 ME 7939 Cap i Cua (Variation désuète sur l’exercice 19 d’Aguado) Pujol n°1248
 ME 7848 Caprice varié sur un thème d’Aguado Pujol n°1242
 ME 7541 Endecha a la Amada Ausente Pujol n°1238
 ME 2186 Étude n°1 Pujol n°1200
 ME 2187 Étude n°2 Pujol n°1201
 ME 2188 Étude n°3 Pujol n°1202
 ME 3128 Exercices en formes d’études, 1. Cahier Pujol n°1221
 ME 7847 2. Cahier Pujol n°1243
 ME 2189 Impromptu Pujol n°1206
 ME 7579 La Libelula Pujol n°1239
 ME 2586-88 Trois Morceaux espagnols: 1. Tonadilla; 2. Tango; 3. Guajira Pujol n°1204
 ME 3129 Pequena Romanza Pujol n°1222
 ME 7885 Pizzicato Pujol n°1247
 ME 7236 Deux Préludes Pujol n°1233
 ME 7027 Rapsodie Valenciana Pujol n°1228
 ME 2190 Sevilla (Evocation) Pujol n°1205
 ME 7030 Triquilandia (Jugando al Escondite) Pujol n°1231
 ME 7237 2e Triquilandia: 1. Œdipe et le Sphinx; 2. Variation; 3. Jeu; 4. La Plume de perdreau; 5. Branle bourguignon Pujol n°1234
 ME 7533 3e Triquilandia: 1. Le Petit Grenadier; 2. Cantilène; 3. Valse Pujol n°1241,
 ME 7991 Triptyque campagnard (1971): 1. Aube; 2. Bucolique; 3. Fête Pujol n°1249
 ME 7883 Variations sur un thème obsédant Pujol n°1244
 ME 7029 Veneciana Pujol n°1230

Guitar duos
 ME 8046 Canaries (Canarios), air de danse populaire ancienne Pujol n°1415
 ME 8081-01 Duet (étude) Pujol n°1417a
 ME 6942 Manola del Avapies (Tonadilla) Pujol n°1403
 ME 7239 Ricercare Pujol n°1409
 ME 8081 Tyrolienne (Tirolesa) Pujol n°1417b

Transcriptions
275 transcriptions (Juan Riera)

Guitar duo
Francis Poulenc (1899–1963). Waltzes, arr from the piano Paris : Editions M. Eschig, c1970.

Discography

Recordings by Emilio Pujol
 Musique instrumentale espagnole au 16e siècle; Paris, France [ca 1936]
 Romances et villancicos espagnols du 16e siècle; Anthologie Sonore, Disque No.17, Paris, France [1935]
 Spanish Songs - Historical Live Recording Of The 1954 Madrid Recital (Rosa Barbany, soprano; Emilio Pujol vihuela) (EMEC Discos; E-050)

Compositions by Emilio Pujol
3CD recording of Pujol compositions by students of Alberto Ponce
Claudio Marcotulli (*1958) Publisher: Genova, Italy: Dynamic, [2002 Program notes and biographical notes in Italian, English, and French and German (19p., portrs.) inserted in container. Contents: Seguidilla—Canción amatoria—Tango—Studio in si minore—Barcarolle—Romanza—Preludio romantico—Guajira—Homenaje a Tárrega—Ondinas—Canción de cuna—Manola del Avapies (tonadilla) -- El cant dels Ocels—Paisaje—Cubana—Studio romantico—Festivola—Scottish madrilène—Salve. Publisher Number: Dynamic CDS 395
MARIA RIBERA GIBAL INTERPRETA EMILI PUJOL (CD, Barcelona 2018, Audiovisuals de Sarrià)

Bibliography

Musicologic works by Emilio Pujol

 Emilio Pujol: El Dilema Del Sonido en la Guitarra. 4 editions:
Hamburg: Trekel, c1975. 1975	German	28, iv, [i] p. ///Das Dilemma des Klanges bei der Gitarre / Emilio Pujol ; hrsg. u. mit e. Vorw. vers. von Wolf Moser ; [Dt. von Wolf Moser], Hamburg: Trekel, c1975. Edition Date:1975 Language:GermanNotes:Translation of Dilema del sonido en la guitarra. Cover title. Physical Details:28, iv, [i] p. ; 21 cm. Other Authors:Moser, Wolf.
Buenos Aires: Ricordi Americana [1960] 1960 Spanish	84 p	
Buenos Aires: Ricordi Americana, c1960. 1960	Spanish	Ed. corr. y amp., con texto inglés y francés. 84 p.	
Buenos Aires: Ricerdi Americana [1960] 1960 Spanish Edición corregida y ampliada. con texto inglés y francés. 84 p (?? 1960/1966. OCLC: 1061872 / 1960 OCLC: 58964343)
El Dilema Del Sonido en la Guitarra (PDF).
 Emilio Pujol: "La Guitare", in: Encyclopédie de la Musique et Dictionnaire du Conservatoire, second part, vol. III, Delagrave. Paris, 1926, pp. 2011–12.
 Emilio Pujol: La Guitarra y su historia; conferencia, Buenos Aires: Casa Romero y Fernandez (1932), OCLC: 48131009
 Emilio Pujol: Tárrega. Ensayo biográfico, Lison: Los Talleres Gráficos de Ramos, Afonso & Moita, Lda., 1960. 2nd edition: S.l., s.n. (Valencia: Artes Gráficas Soler, 1978), Notes:"Obras de Tárrega para guitarra": p. 259-[267] Includes indexes,, OCLC 5287791.

Early music editions
 Emilio Pujol - Tres Libros de música en cifra para vihuela (Sevilla, 1546) / Alonso Mudarra; transcripción y estudio por Emilio Pujol. Barcelona: Consejo Superior de Investigaciones Científicas, 1984 (Reprint of 1949 edition), OCLC 39171049.
 Emilio Pujol - Los Seys libros del Delphin, de música de cifra para tañer vihuela by Luis de Siglo XVI Nerváez; Barcelona: Consejo Superior de Investigaciones Científicas, 1945; OCLC 48310460.
 Emilio Pujol - Libro de música de vihuela, institulado Silva de sirenas (Valladolid, 1547); Barcelona: C.S.I.C. Instituto español de musicología, 1965; OCLC 67466655.

Poems
Emilio Pujol: Poemes; Lleida: Cátedra de Cultura Catalana Samuel Gili i Gaya, Institut d'Estudis Ilerdencs de l'Excma.

Guitar School by Emilio Pujol
A guitar method based on the principles of Francisco Tarrega consisting of four historical and technical volumes:
 Emilio Pujol: Escuela razonada de la guitarra: basada en los principos de la técnica de Tárrega; Buenos Aires: Ricordi Americana, 1954; OCLC 55156339.

Publications about Emilio Pujol
Renata Borgatti: Due aspetti del romanticismo: Schumann e Chopin; Apporto italiano alla chitarra classica [di] Emilio Pujol; Siena: Ticci, 1953; OCLC: 1913194.
Curtis Nunley: Emilio Pujol: The Guitar Pedagogue in Escuela Razonada de la Guitarra, book one and the right hand technique written in El dilemma del sonido en la guitarra (1993); OCLC 31333907.
Daniela Polcher: La Méthode de guitare d'Emilio Pujol (The Emilio Pujol guitar method), bachelor thesis, Paris: Institut de Formation des Enseignants de la Musique, 1999.

References

External links

10 Quotations by Emilio Pujol
Biography
Biography
Biography
Biography 

1886 births
1980 deaths
20th-century classical composers
20th-century guitarists
20th-century Spanish musicians
Composers from Catalonia
Composers for the classical guitar
Spanish male guitarists
Spanish classical composers
Spanish classical guitarists
Spanish male classical composers
20th-century Spanish male musicians